The 2023 Viña Challenger was a professional tennis tournament played on clay courts. It was the first edition of the tournament which was part of the 2023 ATP Challenger Tour. It took place in Viña del Mar, Chile between 13 and 19 March 2023.

Singles main draw entrants

Seeds

 1 Rankings are as of 6 March 2023.

Other entrants
The following players received wildcards into the singles main draw:
  Gonzalo Lama
  Daniel Antonio Núñez
  Miguel Fernando Pereira

The following player received entry into the singles main draw as a special exempt:
  Thiago Seyboth Wild

The following player received entry into the singles main draw as an alternate:
  Pol Martín Tiffon

The following players received entry from the qualifying draw:
  Mateus Alves
  Federico Gaio
  Wilson Leite
  Álvaro López San Martín
  Orlando Luz
  José Pereira

The following player received entry as a lucky loser:
  Gonzalo Villanueva

Champions

Singles

  Thiago Seyboth Wild def.  Hugo Gaston 7–5, 6–1.

Doubles

  Diego Hidalgo /  Cristian Rodríguez def.  Luciano Darderi /  Andrea Vavassori 6–4, 7–6(7–5).

References

Viña Challenger
2023 in Chilean sport
March 2023 sports events in South America